Second Synod of Angamaly  was convoked by Dom Francis Ros, S.J.,  the first Latin bishop of Angamaly, the See of Saint Thomas Christians on 7 December 1603. Francis Ros was the successor of Mar Abraham of Angamaly, the Metropolitan of All-India. The Second Synod of Angamaly had primarily three tasks to undertake. The context of the diocese of Angamaly, immediately after the Synod of Diamper, necessitated another Synod in the fourth year of the governance of Ros.


Introduction 
When Dom Francis Ros returned to Angamaly on 1 May 1601, he was welcomed by the Archdeacon Givargis of the cross (George of the Cross) and the Christians of St. Thomas. Soon, the new bishop knew that there was resistance on the part of the Christians of St. Thomas, regarding the suppression of their ancient Metropolitan title. Moreover, a number of decrees of the Synod of Diamper was in fact an imposition on the Christians, as designed by Archbishop Aleixo de Menezes in 1599 in a context of utmost tension and the resistance of the native priests. In the above-mentioned context, Ros wanted a new Synod in Angamaly to substitute the Synod of Diamper with his Second Synod of Angamaly, which he wanted to convoke, respecting the law of the Latin Church of the time.

Notes and references

Christianity in Kerala